The 4th Grey Cup was played on November 30, 1912, before 5,337 fans at the AAA Grounds in Hamilton, Ontario.

The Hamilton Alerts defeated the Toronto Argonauts 11–4 to win their only Grey Cup.

External links
 

Grey Cup
04
Grey Cup, 04th
1912 in Ontario
November 1912 sports events
20th century in Hamilton, Ontario
Toronto Argonauts
November 1912 events in North America